This is a list of mountains of La Gomera, it also includes hills and named rock formations.

Mountains and hills

Rocks

References

Mountains of Spain
La Gomera